Lambda Aquilae, Latinized from λ Aquilae, is a star in the constellation Aquila. It has the traditional name Al Thalimain , which it shares with ι Aquilae. The name is derived from the Arabic الظلیمين al-ẓalīmayn "the two ostriches". Lambda Aquilae is more precisely Al Thalimain Prior. It has an apparent visual magnitude of 3.43, which is bright enough to be seen with the naked eye.

Properties
Lambda Aquilae is a main sequence star with a stellar classification of B9Vn, which means that, like the Sun, it is generating energy at its core through the nuclear fusion of hydrogen. It is more massive than the Sun, with about three times its mass, and radiates about 55 times the Sun's luminosity from its outer envelope at a higher effective temperature of 11,780 K. This temperature gives Lambda Aquilae the blue-white hue that is a characteristic of B-type stars. Lambda Aquilae was one of the least variable stars observed by the Hipparcos satellite. It is a suspected Lambda Boötis star and has an age of about 160 million years.

This star lies about 5° from the galactic plane and about 30° from the line of sight to the Galactic Center. This region of the sky is crowded with other objects along the line of sight, with at least 55 located within 10 arcseconds of the star. Examination of the star shows no companions with an 85% probability. Despite this, it is suspected of being a spectroscopic binary star. That is, it may have an orbiting companion whose presence is revealed by displacements in the absorption lines in the spectrum caused by the Doppler effect.

Related space mission
NASA's Pioneer 11 space probe, launched in April 1973, exited the Solar System in 1990 and continued in the direction of Lambda Aquilae. It is estimated that it will take around 4 million years for the probe to make its closest approach to its destination, assuming it will remain intact. However, NASA stopped communicating with Pioneer 11 since November 1995 because the space probe's power was already too weak to transmit any data.

Etymology

This star, together with η Aql, θ Aql, δ Aql, ι Aql and κ Aql made up the obsolete constellation Antinous.

References

External links
 
 Image λ Aquilae

Al Thalimain Prior
177756
Aquilae, Lambda
Aquila (constellation)
B-type main-sequence stars
093805
Aquilae, 16
7236
BD-05 4876